The Gau Weser-Ems, formed on 1 October 1928, was an administrative division of Nazi Germany from 1933 to 1945 in the core part of the Free State of Oldenburg, the state of Bremen and the western parts of the Prussian Province of Hanover. Before that, from 1928 to 1933, it was the regional subdivision of the Nazi Party in that area.

History
The Nazi Gau (plural Gaue) system was originally established in a party conference on 22 May 1926, in order to improve administration of the party structure. From 1933 onwards, after the Nazi seizure of power, the Gaue increasingly replaced the German states as administrative subdivisions in Germany.

At the head of each Gau stood a Gauleiter, a position which became increasingly more powerful, especially after the outbreak of the Second World War, with little interference from above. Local Gauleiters often held government positions as well as party ones and were in charge of, among other things, propaganda and surveillance and, from September 1944 onward, the Volkssturm and the defense of the Gau.

The position of Gauleiter in Weser-Ems was held by Carl Röver from 1 October 1928 to his death on 15 May 1942, followed by Paul Wegener from 16 May 1942 to 8 May 1945. Röver, the original Gauleiter, was initially an early supporter of Adolf Hitler in the state of Oldenburg but lost in influence as the years progressed and died in hospital in Berlin under not fully established circumstances. Wegener, his successor, survived the war and died in 1993.

References

External links
 Illustrated list of Gauleiter

Weser-Ems
1928 establishments in Germany
1945 disestablishments in Germany
Bremen (state)
Oldenburg (state)
Province of Hanover